West Harrison is a town in Harrison Township, Dearborn County, Indiana, United States. The population was 289 at the 2010 census.

History
Settlers at West Harrison found numerous mounds constructed by Indians.  West Harrison was laid out in 1813, the same year its twin city of Harrison, Ohio, was founded.

Geography
West Harrison is located at  (39.261283, -84.820869).

West Harrison is located just across the Indiana state line from Harrison, Ohio. The two towns are divided by State Street.

Demographics

2010 census
As of the census of 2010, there were 289 people, 136 households, and 68 families living in the town. The racial makeup of the town was 99.0% White, 0.3% African American, 0.3% Native American, and 0.3% Asian. Hispanic or Latino of any race were 0.3% of the population.

There were 136 households, of which 21.3% had children under the age of 18 living with them, 30.1% were married couples living together, 13.2% had a female householder with no husband present, 6.6% had a male householder with no wife present, and 50.0% were non-families. 43.4% of all households were made up of individuals, and 11% had someone living alone who was 65 years of age or older. The average household size was 2.13 and the average family size was 2.94.

The median age in the town was 42.2 years. 17.3% of residents were under the age of 18; 9.7% were between the ages of 18 and 24; 27.7% were from 25 to 44; 32.9% were from 45 to 64; and 12.5% were 65 years of age or older. The gender makeup of the town was 52.6% male and 47.4% female.

2000 census
As of the census of 2000, there were 284 people, 142 households, and 70 families living in the town. The racial makeup of the town was 99.30% White, 0.35% Native American, and 0.35% from two or more races. Hispanic or Latino of any race were 0.70% of the population.

There were 142 households, out of which 25.4% had children under the age of 18 living with them, 31.0% were married couples living together, 12.7% had a female householder with no husband present, and 50.7% were non-families. 46.5% of all households were made up of individuals, and 9.9% had someone living alone who was 65 years of age or older. The average household size was 2.00 and the average family size was 2.89.

In the town, the population was spread out, with 22.2% under the age of 18, 9.9% from 18 to 24, 33.8% from 25 to 44, 23.2% from 45 to 64, and 10.9% who were 65 years of age or older. The median age was 36 years. For every 100 females, there were 111.9 males. For every 100 females age 18 and over, there were 118.8 males.

The median income for a household in the town was $21,500, and the median income for a family was $23,750. Males had a median income of $32,344 versus $20,313 for females. The per capita income for the town was $12,667. About 32.4% of families and 31.6% of the population were below the poverty line, including 47.3% of those under the age of eighteen and 17.9% of those 65 or over.

Notable people

 Lonnie Mack, virtuoso blues-rock guitar pioneer.

References

Towns in Dearborn County, Indiana
Towns in Indiana
Populated places established in 1813
1813 establishments in Indiana Territory